Ragbi klub Krstaši is a Montenegrin rugby club based in Kotor.

History

Ragbi klub Krstaši played Montenegro Sevens Championship in 2013.
The club is currently inactive as of 2014.

Current squad

 Miloš Mrdak
 Miloš Ojdanić
 Nikola Potpara
 Nikola Vučurović
 Darko Kustudić
 Loran Gečević
 Aleksandar Ivanović
 Anto Petrović
 Lazar Krivokapić

Coaches and assistants

 Nebojša Labović

References

Montenegrin rugby union teams
Kotor
Rugby clubs established in 2011
2011 establishments in Montenegro